Amy Granat (born 1976) is an American artist. She attended Bard College. She works with 16mm film, often manipulating it without using a camera. 

Granat participated in the 2008 Whitney Biennial. In 2017 her film Cars, Trees, Houses, Beaches was included in the Saint Louis Art Museum's New Media Series. Her work is included in the collections of the Whitney Museum of American Art and the Museum of Modern Art, New York.

References

1976 births
Living people
21st-century American artists
21st-century American women artists